To be phenomenal is to occur observably.

 "Phenomenal" (song), a 2015 song by Eminem
 Phénoménal, a 1998 compilation album by French musician Lord Kossity
 Phenomenal Smith (1864–1952), American baseball player
 The Phenomenal One, a nickname for professional wrestler A.J. Styles

See also

 Phenomena (disambiguation)
 Phenomenology (disambiguation)